Fiffty Fiffty is a 1981 Indian Hindi romance drama film directed by Shomu Mukherjee, starring Rajesh Khanna and Tina Munim.

Plot
Thakur Virendra Singh lives a wealthy lifestyle in India along with his wife and a son, Kishan. His relative Bihari is envious, and successfully switches his son, Kumar, with Kishan, and also ends up killing Virendra. In this manner, Kumar grows up living a wealthy lifestyle, while Kishan lives a poor lifestyle, shunned by his father and his mother, who has lost the use of her vocal cords. Bihari takes Kishan to his brother in Bombay and leaves him there to lead a life of crime. Twenty years later, Kishan has grown up and is now a master burglar. He meets with another burglar, Mary, and both decide to be fifty-fifty partners. However, Mary has other plans: she ditches Kishan and joins forces with Diwan Shamsher Singh to masquerade as the long-lost daughter of Ranimaa of Chandpur. Mary does not know that it was the Diwan who has done away with Rajkumari Ratna, and he will not hesitate to kill Mary - or anyone else who dares to stand in his way and the treasure of Chandpur.

Cast
Rajesh Khanna as Kishan Singh
Tina Munim as Mary / Rajkumari Ratna
Kader Khan as Diwan Shamsher Singh
Ranjeet as Kumar Virendra Singh
Om Shivpuri as Bihari Singh
Jagdeep as Photographer / Kidnapper
Nazir Hussain as Mary's Foster Father
Indrani Mukherjee as Shanti B. Singh
Anita Guha as Chandpur's Ranimaa
Purnima as Thakurain V. Singh
Shashi Kiran as Chandpur's Army Officer
Jagdish Raj as Chandpur's Trustee
P Jairaj as Tiwari
Johnny Whisky
Janki Das as Hotel Manager
Mustaque Merchant as 
Rupesh Kumar as Shamsher Goon
Nilu Bhalla as Shamsher Goon
Bhagwan Dada as Dancer

Soundtrack
Lyrics: Anand Bakshi

References

External links

1981 films
1980s Hindi-language films
Films scored by Laxmikant–Pyarelal
Films directed by Shomu Mukherjee
Indian romantic drama films